Wojciech Wala (born 19 February 1965) is a Polish wrestler. He competed in the men's freestyle 100 kg at the 1988 Summer Olympics.

References

1965 births
Living people
Polish male sport wrestlers
Olympic wrestlers of Poland
Wrestlers at the 1988 Summer Olympics
People from Świecie
Sportspeople from Kuyavian-Pomeranian Voivodeship